Stuart Campbell McCluskey (born 29 October 1977) is a Scottish professional footballer. He represented his country, occasionally as captain, at under-19 and under-21 levels.

Career
McCluskey began his career at St Johnstone, with whom he progressed through the youth ranks alongside Danny Griffin and under Paul Sturrock. The defender spent a decade at McDiarmid Park, notching up over a century of league appearances along the way.

In 2004, he joined Clyde, then under the guidance of McCluskey's former teammate in Perth, Alan Kernaghan, until the end of the season.

For the 2004/5 season he joined Greenock Morton, with whom he played one season, before moving back to Tayside to sign with St Johnstone's rivals Dundee, again linking up with Kernaghan, who was the new boss at Dens Park.

In April 2006, McCluskey was one of several players released by Dundee. He was reported to be looking to try his hand in Australia, and in May 2007 joined Melbourne-based Richmond SC, becoming club captain. During the 2008 season he also took up coaching and along with Tony Gignalito coached the Under 16 Richmond junior boys team.

References

External links

1977 births
Living people
Footballers from Bellshill
Scottish footballers
St Johnstone F.C. players
Falkirk F.C. players
Clyde F.C. players
Greenock Morton F.C. players
Airdrieonians F.C. players
Dundee F.C. players
Scottish Premier League players
Scotland under-21 international footballers
Expatriate soccer players in Australia
Scottish Football League players
Association football defenders